William Kraft (September 6, 1923 – February 12, 2022) was an American composer, conductor, teacher, timpanist, and percussionist.

Biography

Early life and education (1923–1954)
Kraft was born in Chicago, Illinois. He was awarded two Anton Seidl Fellowships at Columbia University, graduating with a bachelor's degree cum laude in 1951 and a master's degree in 1954. He studied composition with Jack Beeson and Henry Cowell, orchestration with Henry Brant, percussion with Morris Goldenberg,  timpani from Saul Goodman, and conducting with Rudolph Thomas and Fritz Zweig.

While in New York City, Kraft worked as a freelance musician and was an extra percussionist at the Metropolitan Opera. In 1954, Kraft joined the Dallas Symphony. After one season, he accepted a position as percussionist with the Los Angeles Philharmonic.

At the Los Angeles Philharmonic (1955–1985)
Kraft began as a member of the Los Angeles Philharmonic's percussion section, before being promoted to the orchestra's principal timpanist. From 1968–1972, he also served as the orchestra's assistant conductor, under then music director Zubin Mehta. From 1981–1985, Kraft was Composer-in-Residence for the orchestra; during that period he founded and directed its New Music Group. Altogether he spent 26 years with the Philharmonic. 

In 1958, Kraft founded the Los Angeles Percussion Ensemble, a group which made its debut on March 10 with the Monday Evening Concerts. The group performed the world and local premieres of works by Alberto Ginastera, Lou Harrison, Ernst Krenek, Igor Stravinsky, Edgard Varèse, and other composers. He performed in the local premiere of Pierre Boulez's Le marteau sans maître under the composer's direction and played the American premiere of Karlheinz Stockhausen's Zyklus. The latter led to a journalistic debate between Los Angeles Times music critic Albert Goldberg and Kraft, who took exception to the critic's use of the term "noisemakers" in reference to percussion instruments.

He has also composed film soundtracks, including the scores to Psychic Killer (1975), Avalanche (1978), Bill (1981), and Fire and Ice (1983).

Later years
Kraft served as chairman of the composition department and holder of the Corwin Chair at the University of California, Santa Barbara until he retired in June 2002.

Kraft died on February 12, 2022, at the age of 98.

Commissions and awards

 Kennedy Center Friedheim Awards Second Prize (1984) : Concerto for Timpani and Orchestra
 Kennedy Center Friedheim Awards First Prize (1990) : Veils and Variations for Horns and Orchestra
 Hall of Fame of the Percussive Arts Society (1990)
 American Society of Composers, Authors and Publishers Award

Compositions
In the 1960s and 1970s, most of Kraft's compositions were serial, while in the 1980s he incorporated jazz rhythms and impressionist harmonies. Although percussion works feature prominently in his catalog, in 1996–1998 he concentrated on composing his first opera, Red Azalea. His works have been performed by many major American orchestras as well as those in Europe, Japan, Korea, China, Australia, Israel, and the USSR. Kraft's Contextures: Riots – Decade '60 (1967) has been choreographed and performed by both the Scottish National Ballet and the Minnesota Dance Company. In 1986, United Airlines commissioned a work expressly to accompany a lumetric sculpture by Michael Hayden titled Sky's the Limit, for their pedestrian passageway at Chicago-O'Hare International Airport.

Recordings
Compact discs completely devoted to Kraft's music can be found on Harmonia Mundi, CRI, Cambria, Crystal, Albany, and Nonesuch labels. Other works can be found on GM, Crystal, London Decca, Townhall, EMI, and Neuma. Recent works include Brazen, commissioned by the San Francisco Symphony Orchestra; Quintessence Revisited and Concerto for Four Percussion Soloists and Symphonic Wind Ensemble, premiered and recorded by the New England Conservatory Wind Ensemble, Frank Battisti conducting. His Encounter solo series has been recorded multiple times on all appropriate instruments. On Encounters, he worked with guitarist John Schneider. Encounters II showcases unique techniques for tuba such as multiphonics double pedal range. In 2010, the Los Angeles Philharmonic released a recording on DG Concerts of the Timpani Concerto No. 1 featuring Joseph Pereira as soloist with John Adams conducting.

Discography
 Encounters, (Cambria, 2009), Latin Grammy nomination for Best Classical Album
 Encounters II, (Cambria)

References

Works cited

External links
William Kraft's page at Theodore Presser Company

 
Detailed biography on Music Academy Online
Art of the States: William Kraft 
Interview with William Kraft, May, 1988
NAMM Oral History Interview November 9, 2006

1923 births
2022 deaths
21st-century American composers
21st-century American Jews
21st-century American male musicians
Musicians from Chicago
Columbia University alumni
American male composers
Jewish American classical composers
American percussionists
University of California, Santa Barbara faculty
Classical musicians from Illinois